Defending champion Ilie Năstase successfully defended his title, defeating Stan Smith in the final, 6–3, 6–2, 3–6, 2–6, 6–3 to win the singles title at the 1972 Commercial Union Assurance Masters.

Draw

Finals

Group A
 Standings are determined by: 1. number of wins; 2. number of matches; 3. in two-players-ties, head-to-head records; 4. in three-players-ties, percentage of sets won, or of games won; 5. steering-committee decision.

Group B
 Standings are determined by: 1. number of wins; 2. number of matches; 3. in two-players-ties, head-to-head records; 4. in three-players-ties, percentage of sets won, or of games won; 5. steering-committee decision.

See also
ATP World Tour Finals appearances

References
1972 Masters Singles Draw

Singles